Vertical velocity can refer to:
Either one of two roller coasters located in Six Flags amusement parks:
The Flash: Vertical Velocity located at Six Flags Great America
The Flash: Vertical Velocity located at Six Flags Discovery Kingdom
As a common noun, the term also refers to the movement of air masses upward as related in the omega equation.
Vertical speed